Spatalistis philauta is a species of moth of the family Tortricidae. It is found on Java.

References

Moths described in 1983
philauta
Moths of Indonesia